Wakeman is a surname. Notable people with the surname include:

Adam Wakeman (born 1974), musician, son of Rick Wakeman
Alan Wakeman (born 1947), musician
Alan Wakeman (author) (1936-2015), British author and gay rights activist
Frederic Wakeman (1937-2006), American historian
Sir George Wakeman (died 1688), English doctor, royal physician to Catherine of Braganza
John Wakeman (died 1549),  English Benedictine, the last Abbot of Tewkesbury and first Bishop of Gloucester
Oliver Wakeman (born 1972), musician, son of Rick Wakeman
Rick Wakeman (born 1949), musician
Rodney Wakeman (born 1966), American politician
Shannon Wakeman (born 1990), International rugby player
William Frederick Wakeman (1822 – 1900), Irish archaeologist

Fictional characters:
Jenny Wakeman, female robot from animated series My Life as a Teenage Robot